Józef Ondrusz (18 March 1918 – 27 May 1996) was a Polish teacher, writer and folklorist from the Zaolzie region of Cieszyn Silesia.

Ondrusz was born in the village of Darków to a coal miner. He graduated from a Polish grammar school in Fryštát and later from teachers' seminary in Ostrava. After World War II Ondrusz taught at the Polish school in Darkov and wrote several schoolbooks for Polish schools in Zaolzie. He also co-founded magazines for children, Jutrzenka and Ogniwo. He was an active member of PZKO (Polish Cultural and Educational Union) and also became active in the Polish scouting in Czechoslovakia. He earned a doctorate in 1972 for his thesis Proza ludowa Śląska Cieszyńskiego 1845-1970 (Folk Prose of Cieszyn Silesia 1845-1970).

Ondrusz was fascinated by the culture and traditions of Cieszyn Silesia and was a keen collector of everything related to regional culture. He eventually published traditional folk fables, proverbs and stories, often literally adapting them.

He wrote his works in literary Polish and in the local dialect. His works focus mostly on regional folklore, culture and fables.

Ondrusz also contributed to the popularization of bookplates in Cieszyn Silesia in the 1960s. Many notable Polish and Czech artists made bookplates for him.

Józef Ondrusz died in Darków and is buried at the Lutheran cemetery in the nearby village of Stonawa.

Works
 Przysłowia i powiedzenia ludowe ze Śląska Cieszyńskiego (1954)
 Godki śląskie (1956, 1973, 1974, 1977)
 Przysłowia i przymówiska ludowe ze Śląska Cieszyńskiego (1960)
 Śląskie opowieści ludowe (1963)
 Proza górników karwińskich (1974)
 Wspominki okupacyjne (1981)
 Cudowny chleb (1984, 1986)
 O ptaszku Złotodzióbku i inne bajki (1986)

Footnotes

References
 

 

 

 

1918 births
1996 deaths
Writers from Karviná
People from Austrian Silesia
Polish people from Zaolzie
Polish male writers
Polish folklorists
Polish schoolteachers